Giorgi III may refer to:

George III of Georgia (died in 1184) 
George III of Imereti (died in 1639) 
George III of Guria (died in 1684)